Maciej Wilusz (born 25 August 1988) is a Polish former professional footballer who played as a centre-back.

Club career
On 8 June 2017, he signed a 3-year contract with the Russian Premier League club FC Rostov. His contract was terminated by mutual consent on 15 January 2020.

On 16 January 2020, he signed with Russian Premier League club FC Ural Yekaterinburg.

International career
In 2014, he was called up by the Poland national coach Adam Nawałka to the Poland national football team. His debut came on 18 January 2014 in a 3–0 win in a friendly against Norway. He was called up again in March 2014 for the match against Scotland.

Career statistics

Club

1 Including Polish Super Cup.

Honours

Club
GKS Bełchatów
 I liga: 2013–14

Lech Poznań
 Ekstraklasa: 2014–15
 Polish Super Cup: 2015, 2016

References

External links
 
 

1988 births
Living people
Sportspeople from Wrocław
Polish footballers
Association football defenders
Poland international footballers
SC Heerenveen players
Sparta Rotterdam players
MKS Kluczbork players
GKS Bełchatów players
Lech Poznań players
Korona Kielce players
FC Rostov players
FC Ural Yekaterinburg players
Raków Częstochowa players
Śląsk Wrocław players
II liga players
I liga players
Ekstraklasa players
Russian Premier League players
Polish expatriate footballers
Expatriate footballers in the Netherlands
Expatriate footballers in Russia
Polish expatriate sportspeople in Russia
Polish expatriate sportspeople in the Netherlands